Barry Murphy (born 1997) is an Irish hurler who plays as a centre-forward for club side Doon and at inter-county level with the Limerick senior hurling team.

Playing career

College

Murphy first came to prominence as a hurler with Scoil na Trionóide in Doon. Having played in every grade as a hurler, he eventually joined the school's senior team. On 22 February 2014, Murphy was at left corner-forward when Ardscoil Rís defeated Scoil na Trionóide by 2-13 to 0-04 in the final of the Harty Cup.

University

During his studies at the University of Limerick, Murphy was selected for the college's senior hurling team for the Fitzgibbon Cup.

Club

Murphy joined the Doon club at a young age and played in all grades at juvenile and underage levels, enjoying championship success in under-12, under-14 and under-15 grades. As a member of the club's minor team, he also enjoyed championship success before joining the club's senior team.

Inter-county

Minor and under-21

Murphy first played for Limerick at minor level. On 22 July 2014, he was an unused substitute when Limerick won their second successive Munster Championship title after a 0-24 to 0-18 defeat of Waterford in the final. On 7 September 2014, Murphy was introduced as a substitute for Thomas Grimes in Limerick's 2-17 to 0-19 defeat by Kilkenny in the All-Ireland final. 

Murphy's second and final season with the Limerick minor hurling team ended with an All-Ireland quarter-final defeat by Galway.

Murphy subsequently joined the Limerick under-21 hurling team in 2016 and played during the team's unsuccessful championship campaign. In his second season with the team he won a Munster Championship medal after coming on as a substitute for Tom Morrissey in Limerick's 0-16 to 1-11 defeat of Cork in the final. On 9 September 2017, Murphy was named at centre-forward for Limerick's 0-17 to 0-11 defeat of Kilkenny in the All-Ireland final.

Senior

Murphy joined the Limerick senior hurling panel in 2018 and made his first appearance for the team during the pre-season Munster League. He made his first appearance in the National Hurling League on 28 January 2018 after being introduced as a 46th-minute substitute for Gearóid Hegarty in a 1-25 to 0-18 defeat of Laois. He made his Munster Championship debut on 20 May 2018 and scored a goal in a 1-23 to 2-14 defeat of Tipperary. On 19 August 2018, Murphy was a member of the extended panel when Limerick won their first All-Ireland title in 45 years after a 3-16 to 2-18 defeat of Galway in the final.

On 31 March 2019, Murphy started Limerick's National League final meeting with Waterford on the bench. He was introduced as a 64th-minute substitute for Aaron Gillane and collected a winners' medal following the 1-24 to 0-19 victory. On 2 June 2019, Murphy sustained a bad hamstring injury in the final minutes of Limerick's Munster Championship defeat of Waterford. After undergoing a number of scans and an operation, Murphy was later ruled out for the rest of season.

Career statistics

Honours

Limerick
All-Ireland Senior Hurling Championship (1): 2018
National Hurling League (1): 2019
Munster Senior Hurling League (1): 2018
All-Ireland Under-21 Hurling Championship (1): 2017
Munster Under-21 Hurling Championship (1): 2017
Munster Minor Hurling Championship (1): 2014

References

1997 births
Living people
Doon hurlers
Limerick inter-county hurlers